Abernethy is a village in Perth and Kinross, Scotland, situated  south-east of Perth.

Etymology
Abernethy, recorded in the 10th century as Aburnethige, means 'mouth of the river Nethy'. The first element of the name is the Pictish word aber 'river mouth'. The river-name Nethy is from the Celtic root nect- 'pure, clean'. The Nethy Burn flows down from the Ochil Hills past the present village. The Gaelic form of the name is Obar Neithich and derives from the same roots as the English name.

History
The village was once the "capital" (or at least a major religious and political centre) of the kingdom of the Picts. The parish church, which sits on land given by Nechtan, king of the Picts, is dedicated to Saint Brigid of Kildare of (fl. 451–525), and the church is said to have been founded by Dairlugdach, second abbess of Kildare, one of early Christian Ireland's major monasteries.

Abernethy was the site of the Treaty of Abernethy in 1072 between William the Conqueror and Malcolm III of Scotland.

Abernethy is believed to have been the seat of an early Pictish bishopric, its diocese extending westward along Strathearn. In the 12th century the bishop's seat was moved to Muthill, then Dunblane, so that Abernethy, no longer being a residential bishopric is today listed by the Catholic Church as a titular see.

Abernethy remained the site of a small priory of Augustinian canons, founded 1272. In the 15th century, this priory was suppressed in favour of a collegiate church under the patronage of the Douglas Earls of Angus. Remains of the collegiate church survived until 1802 within the present village graveyard, when they were replaced by the present plain red sandstone church, which is still dedicated to Saint Brigid.

Abernethy Round Tower

The village has one of Scotland's two surviving Irish-style round towers (the other is at Brechin, Angus); both are in the care of Historic Environment Scotland. The tower was evidently built in two stages (shown by a change in the masonry), and probably dates from the 11th to early 12th centuries.

Several pieces of Pictish or early medieval sculpture have been found in Abernethy, including an incomplete Pictish symbol stone attached to the base of the round tower. The location "Afarnach's Hall" referred to in the earliest mediaeval Arthurian literature is usually identified as Abernethy.

The museum, open 2 p.m. to 5 p.m. from Wednesday to Sunday between May and September, has exhibits on the history of the village and also holds a key to the tower.

Culture

Over the years local industry and commerce has largely declined. A general store is the only shop remaining on the Main Street (the post office having closed in early 2009). However, the village still manages to support a local pub. A mobile post office also visits the village most weekdays.

A Gala / Fete Day is held annually on the first or second Saturday in June, with a race to the top of nearby Castle Law taking place the following day.

Transport
The village is located near the M90 motorway and has an infrequent bus service to nearby towns. Abernethy railway station served the village until 1955, when it was closed by the British Transport Commission.

Explanatory notes 
1. The foundation of Abernethy is to be found in the Pictish Chronicle and links it to Nechtan Morbet. However, it may have been Nechtan nepos Uerb, and the later Nechtan mac Der-Ilei may have been confused with the previous two.

References

External links 
 
 

Collegiate churches in Scotland
Villages in Perth and Kinross